Finlay Ballantyne Speedie (18 August 1880 – 5 February 1953) was a Scottish footballer who played for Rangers, Newcastle United and Scotland in the 1900s. He was a versatile forward who was most at home at inside left.

Career
Speedie began his career with junior clubs Clydebank and Strathclyde (playing for both in different competitions) then joined Rangers in 1900. Playing under William Wilton he won two League championships, a Scottish Cup, two Glasgow Cups, a Charity Cup and the 1901 Glasgow Exhibition Cup.

He left Rangers in 1906 after a match against Celtic was played for his benefit and joined Newcastle United, where he won the English First Division in 1906–07 in his first season. He stayed on Tyneside for another season before joining Oldham for a season and then moved to Bradford Park Avenue for a few months before eventually re-joining old club Dumbarton; he won the old Scottish Division Two title in 1911.

Speedie won three Scotland caps, scoring two goals — all in 1903. 

During the First World War he served with the Argyll and Sutherland Highlanders and was awarded the Military Medal. He maintained his links with Dumbarton and coached the team in the 1930s. His brother Willie had also played for the club (as well as for Third Lanark), and his nephew Bob (son of Willie, and nephew and cousin respectively of footballers Bob Ferrier of Sheffield Wednesday and Bob Ferrier Jr. of Motherwell) was a Sons player in the late 1930s.

Speedie died on 5 February 1953, aged 72.

Honours
Newcastle United
Football League champions: 1906–07
Sheriff of London Charity Shield: 1907
FA Cup: Runner-up 1908

References

External links

1880 births
1953 deaths
Sportspeople from Dumbarton
Footballers from West Dunbartonshire
Scottish footballers
Association football inside forwards
Scotland international footballers
Clydebank Juniors F.C. players
Strathclyde F.C. players 
Rangers F.C. players
Dumbarton F.C. players
Newcastle United F.C. players
Oldham Athletic A.F.C. players
Bradford (Park Avenue) A.F.C. players
Argyll and Sutherland Highlanders soldiers
British Army personnel of World War I
Recipients of the Military Medal
Scottish Football League players
Scottish Junior Football Association players
Scottish Football League representative players
English Football League players
FA Cup Final players
Dumbarton F.C. non-playing staff
Association football coaches